Mount Hardy may refer to:

 Mount Hardy, a mountain in Antarctica
 Mount Hardy (Washington), a mountain in Washington state
 Mount Hardy (North Carolina), a mountain in the state of North Carolina